Ramakrishna Mission Vivekananda Centenary College, popularly known as Rahara V.C college is one of the best colleges of West Bengal, currently Autonomous and affiliated to the West Bengal State University. It is named after Swami Vivekananda. It was formerly affiliated with the Calcutta University. It is administered by the Ramakrishna Mission Order. The College is situated in Rahara, Khardaha, North 24 Parganas district in the state of West Bengal, India. The college is ranked 13th among other colleges in India by the National Institutional Ranking Framework (NIRF) in 2022.

Courses 
The college offers undergraduate level courses in Chemistry, Botany, Physics, Mathematics, Zoology, Microbiology and Computer Science leading to the honours degree. The college has already started postgraduate course in Chemistry and Botany. A new postgraduate course in mathematics has also started from the year 2018. The college also has status "potential for excellence (CPE)" and it is a DST-FIST sponsored centre. It has been granted autonomous status by UGC, New Delhi.

Accreditation and Affiliation
The college is accredited 'A++' grade by the National Assessment and Accreditation Council with a CGPA score of 3.8 and it is affiliated to West Bengal State University. The college has a very good reputation for its discipline and administration. The College now enjoys autonomous status By UGC from the session 2017-18 to 2022-2023.

Departments
 Physics
 Chemistry
 Mathematics
 Botany
 Zoology
 Computer Science
 Microbiology

Student life and culture

Festivals 
Freshers' Welcome, Annual Prize Distribution Ceremony, Blood Donation Camps, Seminars, Eye Operation Camps, Birthday Ceremony of Sri Ramakrishna, Maa Sarada and Swami Vivekananda and many other monastic disciples of Sri Ramakrishna Paramahansa Deva.

Auditorium 
The college has two auditoriums, R. K. Hall with a capacity of 500 seats; and Vivekananda Hall, fully air-conditioned with a capacity of 200 seats, opened on the Golden Jubilee Celebration of the College, inaugurated by Bratya Basu, Minister for Higher Education, Government of West Bengal. A new community hall named "Sri Ramakrishna Hall", fully air-conditioned with a capacity of 1000 seats, opened on the celebration of 150th birth anniversary of sister Nivedita, inaugurated by Prof. Tathagata Roy, Governor of Tripura on 9 December 2016.

Sister Nivedita Multigym 
On the 150th birth anniversary of sister Nivedita, a multi gym, named after sister Nivedita was inaugurated by Brian McEldulf, Ambassador of Ireland on 9 December 2016.

Alumni
 Tapan K. Datta
 Manoj Prasad
 Ujjwal Maulik
 Goutam Halder
 Chinmoy Biswas

See also
 List of Ramakrishna Mission institutions
 Rahara Ramakrishna Mission Boys' Home High School

References

External links
 Official website 
Golden Jubilee website
 Judgements on Ramakrishna Mission Vivekananda Centenary College

Educational institutions established in 1963
Universities and colleges affiliated with the Ramakrishna Mission
Colleges affiliated to West Bengal State University
Universities and colleges in North 24 Parganas district
1963 establishments in West Bengal